Podalia pellucens is a moth of the Megalopygidae family. It was described by Paul Dognin.

References

Megalopygidae